Turnstyles & Junkpiles is Pullman's debut album. Released on August 11, 1998, by Thrill Jockey, Turnstyles & Junkpiles was recorded live to analog 2-track with two AKG 451-EB microphone in the Cool Blue Cave by Bundy K. Brown in November 1997, with two exceptions: "Two Parts Water" and "Beacon & Kent", which were recorded at home by Curtis Harvey and Chris Brokaw, respectively. The album was edited at Soma Electronic Music Studios in Chicago, Illinois, and mastered by Roger Seibel at SAE Digital & Analog Mastering, in Phoenix, Arizona.

Critical reception 

In its review of the album, NME characterized it as "by turns evocative, lyrical and heavy with a submerged sense of unease, like Ry Cooder's soundtrack for Paris, Texas filtered through the minds of distressed rock musicians." In September 2009, Fact magazine placed Turnstyles & Junkpiles at number 3 in its list "20 best: Post-Rock records ever made", going on to describe it as "quiet wonder personified. Heartbreaking and more cockle-warming than an autumn bonfire." In his review for Allmusic, Jonathan Cohen stated that "Turnstyles & Junkpiles is an honest tribute to some of the acoustic guitar's most important innovators," pronouncing it "a perfect soundtrack for an AM spent in lovely dreams". CMJ New Music Monthly stated that Turnstyles and Junkpiles is akin to "a Sunday in the park: Gentle, fingerpicked guitar patterns are the order of the day here"; similarly, Spin magazine declared that "Pullman's pensively paced compositions allow each note to glisten in tranquil isolation."

Track listing 
All songs written and performed by Chris Brokaw, Bundy K. Brown, Curtis Harvey and Doug McCombs, except as indicated.

Personnel 

 Chris Brokaw 
 Bundy K. Brown 
 Curtis Harvey 
 Doug McCombs 
 
with 
 
 David Pajo 
 
Additional personnel 
 
 Bundy K. Brown – Producer 
 Curtis Harvey – Producer 
 Chris Brokaw – Producer 
 Roger Seibel – Mastering 
 James Warden – Photography
 Sheila Sachs – Layout

References

External links 
 Allmusic, Review of Pullman's Turnstyles & Junkpiles 
 NME, Review of Pullman's Turnstyles & Junkpiles

Pullman (band) albums
1998 albums